Domenico Giovanni Giuseppe Maria Lanza (15 February 1810  9 March 1882) was an Italian politician and the eighth prime minister of Italy from 1869 to 1873.

Biography
Lanza was born in the Piedmontese city of Casale Monferrato. He studied medicine at Turin, capital of the Kingdom of Sardinia, then returned to Casale where he divided his energies between practising medicine and developing his 33 hectare estate in nearby Roncaglia. He studied and wrote on agricultural developments in both the practical and social aspects. Lanza was among the first in Monferrato to introduce such modern equipment as iron ploughs and seed drills, and also involved himself in the agricultural education of poor children, hoping to achieve at once “the betterment of our agriculture and the moral and intellectual betterment of our agricultural workers.”

Lanza was also an active member of the Subalpine Agricultural Association of Turin and became its secretary. The association was concerned about reforming the political and economic spheres, as well as agriculture, and its identification with the cause of liberal nationalism—with the Risorgimento—was underlined at the September 1847 agrarian congress in Casale, when Lanza raised the cry of "Viva l'Italia libera ed indipendente!" Later he commented on that event: "I did not join the association purely to improve the cultivation of cabbages.",

Parliamentary collaboration with Cavour

Lanza took an active part in the uprising of 1848 and was elected to the Piedmont Parliament that same year. He attached himself to the party of Cavour and devoted his attention chiefly to questions of the economy and finance. He became minister of education in 1855 in the Cavour cabinet, and in 1858 minister of finance.
Chamber. He was minister of the interior (1864–1865) in the La Marmora cabinet, and arranged the transfer of the capital to Florence. He maintained a resolute opposition to the financial policies of Menabrea, who resigned in 1869 when Lanza was elected for the second time as President of the Chamber.

Prime Minister of Italy

Lanza formed a new cabinet in which he appointed himself minister of the interior. With Quintino Sella as minister of finance he sought to reorganize the Italian budget and resigned office when Sella's projects were rejected in 1873.

Legacy in the Unification of Italy

His cabinet had seen the accomplishment of Italian unity and the installation of an Italian government in Rome after the defeat of the Papal States in late 1870.

Notes

External links
 

1810 births
1882 deaths
People from Casale Monferrato
People from the Kingdom of Sardinia
Historical Right politicians
Prime Ministers of Italy
Italian Ministers of the Interior
Deputies of Legislature I of the Kingdom of Sardinia
Deputies of Legislature II of the Kingdom of Sardinia
Deputies of Legislature III of the Kingdom of Sardinia
Deputies of Legislature IV of the Kingdom of Sardinia
Deputies of Legislature V of the Kingdom of Sardinia
Deputies of Legislature VI of the Kingdom of Sardinia
Deputies of Legislature VII of the Kingdom of Sardinia
Presidents of the Chamber of Deputies (Italy)
Deputies of Legislature VIII of the Kingdom of Italy
Deputies of Legislature IX of the Kingdom of Italy
Deputies of Legislature X of the Kingdom of Italy
Deputies of Legislature XI of the Kingdom of Italy
Deputies of Legislature XII of the Kingdom of Italy
Deputies of Legislature XIII of the Kingdom of Italy
Deputies of Legislature XIV of the Kingdom of Italy
Politicians of Piedmont